Eduardo Araújo (born Eduardo Oliveira Araújo; July 23, 1942 in Joaíma) is a Brazilian rock singer. Once part of the Jovem Guarda movement, he is now linked to the country music scene. He is famous for his Jovem Guarda hit "O Bom".

Discography

Albums

References
 [ Biography of Eduardo Araújo] at allmusic

External links
Eduardo Araújo official website (in Portuguese)

1942 births
Living people
People from Minas Gerais
Brazilian rock musicians
20th-century Brazilian male singers
20th-century Brazilian singers
Jovem Guarda
Brazilian rock singers